Dyella jejuensis is a Gram-negative, aerobic, rod-shaped and motile bacterium from the genus of Dyella which has been isolated from soil from the Hallasan Mountain on Jeju Island in Korea.

References

Xanthomonadales
Bacteria described in 2015